The 2001 Categoría Primera A season, named Copa Mustang 2001 for sponsoring purposes, was the 54th season of Colombia's top-flight football league. América de Cali were the defending champions and won their eleventh title and second in a row by beating Independiente Medellín in the finals.

Format 
The season was split into four stages: the first two stages were the Apertura and Finalización tournaments, in which the 16 teams were first divided into two groups of eight teams, playing seven games, and then all teams in the league played each other once for a total of 22 matches. The winners of each tournament earned a berth into the 2002 Copa Libertadores. The third stage was the semifinal round, which was played by the best eight teams of the aggregate table of both tournaments, who were divided into two groups of four according to their position in the aggregate table: odd-ranked teams made up Group A, while even-ranked ones made up Group B. The winners of each group played the double-legged finals to decide the champions of the season, who also qualified for the Copa Libertadores.

Teams

Torneo Apertura 
The Torneo Apertura (also known as Copa Mustang I) began on 11 February and ended on 1 July.

Standings

Torneo Finalización 
The Torneo Finalización (also known as Copa Mustang II) began on 5 August and ended on 11 November.

Standings

Aggregate table 
An aggregate table known as Reclasificación including the games of both tournaments (Apertura and Finalización) was used to determine the eight teams that would advance to the next stage of the tournament. The top eight teams in this table at the end of the Torneo Finalización advanced to the semifinals.

Semifinals 
The third stage of the tournament consisted of two groups of four teams, with Group A including teams in odd-numbered positions and Group B including teams in even-numbered positions. The winners of each group qualified for the Finals.

Group A

Group B

Finals

Top goalscorers

Relegation

Relegation table 

Rules for classification: 1st average; 2nd wins; 3rd goal difference; 4th number of goals scored; 5th away goals scored.

Promotion triangular 

With the General Assembly of DIMAYOR having approved an expansion of the tournament from 16 to 18 teams starting from the 2002 season, a special promotion tournament was played at the end of the 2001 season. The two DIMAYOR affiliates that were taking part in Categoría Primera B at the time and failed to earn promotion (Cúcuta Deportivo and Unión Magdalena) were invited to compete, as well as Atlético Bucaramanga as the team that was relegated from Primera A at the end of the season. The top two teams of the triangular tournament were promoted. All matches were played at Estadio Pedro de Heredia in Cartagena.

References

External links 
 Dimayor official website
 Colombia 2001 RSSSF

Categoría Primera A seasons
1
Col